The Tromsøysund Tunnel is an undersea highway tunnel in Tromsø Municipality in Troms og Finnmark county, Norway. The tunnel runs under the Tromsøysundet strait, connecting the island of Tromsøya (and the city of Tromsø) with the mainland  suburb of Tromsdalen.

The tunnel is part of European route E08, (whose northern terminus is on the island itself) and it consists of two tubes, each with two driving lanes. The two tubes are linked by 15 service-tunnels.

The tunnel opened on 3 December 1994 to relieve Tromsøya's only other mainland connection, the Tromsø Bridge, which had been plagued by severe traffic congestion for more than a decade. The tunnel is located to the north of the bridge; on the island side it emerges just below the University of Tromsø and the University Hospital of North Norway, both major sources of traffic between the island and the mainland; on the mainland side it emerges at Tomasjord, which is centrally located between the densely populated suburbs of Tromsdalen and Kroken.

See also
List of tunnels in Norway

References

External links

Road tunnels in Troms og Finnmark
Subsea tunnels in Norway
Buildings and structures in Tromsø
1994 establishments in Norway
Tunnels completed in 1994
Roads within the Arctic Circle